Fernando de Melo Viana (15 March 1878 – 10 February 1954) was a Brazilian politician who was the 11th vice president of Brazil from 15 November 1926 to 24 October 1930 serving under President Washington Luís. As vice president, he also served as the President of the Senate. Later, he served as President of the 1946 Constituent Assembly.

References

1878 births
1954 deaths
People from Sabará
Brazilian people of Portuguese descent
Republican Party of Minas Gerais politicians
Social Democratic Party (Brazil, 1945–65) politicians
Vice presidents of Brazil
Presidents of the Federal Senate (Brazil)
20th-century Brazilian people

Coffee with milk politics politicians
Candidates for Vice President of Brazil